In differential geometry, a quaternionic manifold is a quaternionic analog of a complex manifold. The definition is more complicated and technical than the one for complex manifolds due in part to the noncommutativity of the quaternions and in part to the lack of a suitable calculus of holomorphic functions for quaternions. The most succinct definition uses the language of G-structures on a manifold. Specifically, a quaternionic n-manifold can be defined as a smooth manifold of real dimension 4n equipped with a torsion-free -structure. More naïve, but straightforward, definitions lead to a dearth of examples, and exclude spaces like quaternionic projective space which should clearly be considered as quaternionic manifolds.

Definitions

The enhanced quaternionic general linear group

Since this scalar multiplication is -linear (but not -linear) we have another embedding of  into .

Almost quaternionic structure

Equivalently, it can be defined as a subbundle  of the endomorphism bundle  such that each fiber  is isomorphic (as a real algebra) to the quaternion algebra . The subbundle  is called the almost quaternionic structure bundle. A manifold equipped with an almost quaternionic structure is called an almost quaternionic manifold.

The quaternion structure bundle  naturally admits a bundle metric coming from the quaternionic algebra structure, and, with this metric,  splits into an orthogonal direct sum of vector bundles

The unit sphere bundle

inside  corresponds to the pure unit imaginary quaternions. These are endomorphisms of the tangent spaces that square to −1. The bundle  is called the twistor space of the manifold , and its properties are described in more detail below. One can always find  such that 

That is, the bundle  may admit no global sections (e.g. this is the case with quaternionic projective space ). This is in marked contrast to the situation for complex manifolds, which always have a globally defined almost complex structure.

Quaternionic structure

A quaternionic structure on a smooth manifold  is an almost quaternionic structure  which admits a torsion-free affine connection  preserving . Such a connection is never unique, and is not considered to be part of the quaternionic structure.

Special cases and additional structures

Hypercomplex manifolds

A hypercomplex manifold is a quaternionic manifold with a torsion-free -structure.

Quaternionic Kähler manifolds

A quaternionic Kähler manifold is a quaternionic manifold with a torsion-free -structure.

Hyperkähler manifolds

A hyperkähler manifold is a quaternionic manifold with a torsion-free -structure. A hyperkähler manifold is simultaneously a hypercomplex manifold and a quaternionic Kähler manifold.

Twistor space

When , the space  admits a natural almost complex structure, but this structure is integrable only if the manifold is self-dual.

The twistor space theory gives a method of translating problems on quaternionic manifolds into problems on complex manifolds, which are much better understood, and amenable to methods from algebraic geometry. Unfortunately, the twistor space of a quaternionic manifold can be quite complicated, even for simple spaces like .

References

 
 

Differential geometry
Manifolds
Quaternions
Structures on manifolds